Michael Andrew Trujillo (born January 12, 1960) is an American former Major League Baseball (MLB) pitcher who played for the Boston Red Sox, Seattle Mariners, and Detroit Tigers from  to .

Amateur career
A native of Denver, Colorado, Trujillo attended Denver's Mullen High School where he played several sports. He was recruited to play college football at Yale but chose to hold out for a college baseball scholarship. He accepted an offer to play baseball at the University of Northern Colorado. In 1981, he played collegiate summer baseball with the Orleans Cardinals of the Cape Cod Baseball League.

Professional career

Chicago White Sox
Trujillo was drafted in the 7th round (172nd overall) of the 1982 MLB draft by the Chicago White Sox in the free agent draft. After Trujillo was drafted, it took three years for him to reach the majors.

Boston Red Sox
On September 7, 1984, Trujillo was traded to the San Francisco Giants for Tom O'Malley. He was selected from the Giants by Boston Red Sox in the Rule 5 draft 3 months later.

Trujillo's first career start was in Boston with the Red Sox on April 14, 1985, at the age of 25. As a rookie, he ended the season with an ERA of 4.82 going 4–4. That year, Trujillo recorded 19 strikeouts in 84 full innings pitched while allowing 23 walks and 7 home runs.

During his second year pitching for the Red Sox, he played in three games in the majors, pitching only 5.2 innings. He spent most of 1986 with the Pawtucket Red Sox, where he had a record of 8–9 as a relief pitcher.

Seattle Mariners
In August, 1986, Trujillo (along with Rey Quiñones, Mike Brown, and a player to named later was traded to the Seattle Mariners. The Red Sox obtained Spike Owen and Dave Henderson.

Trujillo spent the rest of the season in the majors with the Mariners. He earned his first major league shutout on September 20. He finished the season with a 3–2 record, with 19 strikeouts. During his second season as a Mariner, he went 4–4 in 28 games while recording 36 strikeouts. He allowed 12 home runs and 70 hits during the season. He was released during spring training the following year.

Detroit Tigers
On March 31, 1988, three days after his release by the Mariners, Trujillo signed a contract with the Detroit Tigers. Trujillo again spent most of the season in the minors with the Toledo Mud Hens, but did pitch six games for Detroit. He did not earn any wins or losses pitching only 12.1 innings with an ERA of 5.11.

During his final MLB season with the Tigers, Trujillo pitched 25.2 innings. He allowed 35 hits but only 3 homers. His last major league game was on June 17, 1989. On August 6, 1989, he was sold to the New York Mets, but was granted free agency 2 months later after pitching in 9 games  for the minor league Tidewater Tides, ending his career.

References

External links

Mike Trujillo at Baseball Almanac

1960 births
Living people
American expatriate baseball players in Canada
Appleton Foxes players
Baseball players from Denver
Boston Red Sox players
Calgary Cannons players
Denver Zephyrs players
Detroit Tigers players
Glens Falls White Sox players
Major League Baseball pitchers
Niagara Falls Sox players
Orleans Firebirds players
Pawtucket Red Sox players
Seattle Mariners players
Tidewater Tides players
Toledo Mud Hens players
Northern Colorado Bears baseball players